Yacine Bezzaz (born 10 July 1981 in Grarem Gouga) is an Algerian retired footballer who played as a winger.

Club career
On 28 July 2011, Bezzaz reached an agreement to terminate his contract with Troyes. Two days later, he signed a two-year contract with USM Alger.

Career statistics

Club

International

International goals

Honors

International
Algeria
Africa Cup of Nations four place:2010

References

External links
LFP Profile

Player profile – dzfoot.com
Yacine Bezzaz at Footballdatabase

1981 births
2010 Africa Cup of Nations players
2013 Africa Cup of Nations players
Algeria international footballers
Algeria under-23 international footballers
Algeria youth international footballers
Algerian footballers
Algerian expatriate sportspeople in France
Algerian expatriate footballers
AC Ajaccio players
Valenciennes FC players
RC Strasbourg Alsace players
JS Kabylie players
CS Constantine players
ES Troyes AC players
USM Alger players
MC El Eulma players
Ligue 1 players
Ligue 2 players
Living people
Expatriate footballers in France
People from Mila Province
MC Oran players
Algerian Ligue Professionnelle 1 players
Competitors at the 2001 Mediterranean Games
Association football midfielders
Mediterranean Games competitors for Algeria
21st-century Algerian people